The Wilhelm Friedemann Bach House is a cultural site in Halle in Saxony-Anhalt, Germany. The composer Wilhelm Friedemann Bach (1710–1784), eldest son of Johann Sebastian Bach, lived here during part of his career; the building now has an exhibition about W. F. Bach and other composers who lived in Halle.

History
From 1746 to 1770, Wilhelm Friedemann Bach lived in Halle, where he was organist at Marktkirche Unser Lieben Frauen; from 1763 or earlier, he lived in this house.

The house was opened to the public in 2012, after renovation work. In a new part of the building is the exhibition Musikstadt Halle. In the part preserved in its original state is a 16th-century  (an insulated, heated room), and musical instruments from the 16th century.

Exhibition

There is a permanent exhibition, Musikstadt Halle, about the lives and works of composers associated with Halle: Samuel Scheidt (1587–1654), George Frideric Handel, Wilhelm Friedemann Bach, Johann Friedrich Reichardt (1752–1814), Carl Loewe (1796–1869) and Robert Franz (1815–1892); and about Hausmusik (home concerts) in Halle. The exhibition is operated by Stiftung Händel-Haus (the Handel House Foundation, established for Handel's birthplace in Halle).

See also
 List of music museums

References

Biographical museums in Germany
Music museums in Germany
Museums in Saxony-Anhalt